The 1996 NAIA Men's Division I Basketball Tournament was held in March at Mabee Center in Tulsa, Oklahoma. The 59th annual NAIA basketball tournament featured 32 teams playing in a single-elimination format.

Awards and honors
Leading scorers: 
Leading rebounder: 
Player of the Year: Jason Cason (Birmingham Southern).

1996 NAIA bracket

  * denotes overtime.

See also
1996 NAIA Division I women's basketball tournament
1996 NCAA Division I men's basketball tournament
1996 NCAA Division II men's basketball tournament
1996 NCAA Division III men's basketball tournament
1996 NAIA Division II men's basketball tournament

References

Tournament
NAIA Men's Basketball Championship
NAIA Division I men's basketball tournament
NAIA Division I men's basketball tournament